Nikola Karabatić (born 11 April 1984) is a French handball player for Paris Saint-Germain and the French national team.

With the French national handball team, he has won three Olympic gold medals (Summer Olympics of 2008, 2012 and 2020), four World Championship gold medals (2009, 2011, 2015 and 2017) as well as three gold medals in the European Championship (2006, 2010 and 2014). He also won L'Équipe Champion of Champions in 2011. He is regarded as one of the greatest players in handball history, and he was IHF World Player of the Year for a male record-tying three times, in 2007, 2014, and 2016.

Club career
Karabatić began his professional career at the top French club Montpellier HB. There he became French champion in 2002, 2003, 2004 and 2005 as well as winner of the EHF Champions League in 2003. He then played for the German club THW Kiel, who became German champions in 2006, 2007, 2008 and 2009, and won the EHF Champions League in 2007. In the summer of 2009 he left Germany and returned to Montpellier HB, winning three further French champion titles in 2010, 2011 and 2012. After a quick stay in Pays d'Aix Université Club handball, Aix-en-Provence, between February and June in 2013, he moved to FC Barcelona and then in 2015 he moved to and currently plays for PSG Handball.

International career
He is an Olympic, World and European champion. He first became a European champion in the 2006 European Men's Handball Championship, subsequentially becoming a bronze medallist in the 2008 edition of the championship. He has received two bronze medals at the World Championships, in 2003 and 2005. At the 2007 World Men's Handball Championship, he was voted into the All-Star Team in which France finished fourth. He was also voted into the All Star Team at the 2004 European Men's Handball Championship.

Personal life
Nikola was born in Niš, SFR Yugoslavia, to a Croatian father and Serbian mother. Nikola's father Branko Karabatić, who was also a professional handball player, is originally from Vrsine, a village between Trogir and Marina in Croatia. In his career, Branko played for the Železničar handball team from Niš, which is where he met his wife Radmila, who is originally from Aleksinac, Serbia. The family moved to France after Nikola's father got a coaching job there when Nikola was 3 and a half years old. His younger brother, Luka, is also a professional handball player.

On 30 September 2012, he was involved in match-fixing and was arrested alongside his wife and his brother Luka.

In addition to French, he speaks English,  Serbo-Croatian, German and Spanish.

Achievements

Club
 EHF Champions League:
 Winner in 2003, 2007, 2015
 Runners up in 2008, 2009, 2017
 IHF Super Globe: 2013, 2014
 European Super Cup: 2007
 French league: 2002, 2003, 2004, 2005, 2010, 2011,  2012, 2016, 2017, 2018, 2019, 2020, 2021, 2022
 French cup: 2001, 2002, 2003, 2005, 2010, 2012, 2018, 2021, 2022
 French league cup: 2004, 2005, 2010, 2011, 2012, 2017, 2018
 French supercup: 2010, 2011, 2015, 2016
 German league: 2006, 2007, 2008, 2009
 German cup: 2007, 2008, 2009
 German supercup: 2005, 2007, 2008
 Spanish league: 2014, 2015
 Spanish cup: 2014, 2015
 Spanish supercup: 2013, 2014
 Asobal cup: 2013, 2014
 Catalonia Supercup: 2013, 2014
 Pyrenees league: 2004

International
 Olympics
 Gold: 2008, 2012, 2020
 Silver: 2016
 World championship
 Gold: 2009, 2011, 2015, 2017
 Silver: 2023
 Bronze: 2005, 2019
 European championship
 Gold: 2006, 2010, 2014
 Bronze: 2008, 2018
 World cup 2002
 Tournoi de France: 2007, 2011

Individual
 IHF World Player of the Year – Men
 Winner: 2007, 2014, 2016
 Second: 2009, 2010, 2015
 With French national team:
 Most Valuable Player (MVP) of the World Championship (2): 2011, 2017
 Most Valuable Player (MVP) of the European Championship (2): 2008, 2014
 Top Scorer of the European Championship: 2008
 All-Star Centre back of the Olympic Games: 2012, 2016
 All-Star Centre back of the World Championship: 2009, 2015
 All-Star Centre back of the European Championship: 2010
 All-Star Left back of the World Championship: 2007
 All-Star Left back of the European Championship: 2004
 Best player of Tournoi de France: 2007, 2011
 With clubs:
 champions league
 Best striker: 2007 (89 goals)
 All-stars team: 2014
 France
 Best player of French league: 2010, 2013, 2017
 Best left back of French league: 2004, 2005
 Best center back of French league: 2010, 2016, 2017
 Best player of French supercup: 2010
 Germany
 Best player of the year in Germany: 2007, 2008
 Best player of the season in German league: 2006–07, 2007–08
 Best left back in German league: 2006, 2007, 2008
 Best player of German All-stars game: 2007
 Best player of Spanish league: 2014, 2015
 Others
 Sportsman on France: 2011

See also
List of handballers with 1000 or more international goals

References

External links

1984 births
Living people
French male handball players
French people of Croatian descent
French people of Serbian descent
Handball players at the 2004 Summer Olympics
Handball players at the 2008 Summer Olympics
Handball players at the 2012 Summer Olympics
Handball players at the 2016 Summer Olympics
Olympic handball players of France
Olympic gold medalists for France
Sportspeople from Niš
Montpellier Handball players
Olympic medalists in handball
Yugoslav emigrants to France
Medalists at the 2012 Summer Olympics
Medalists at the 2008 Summer Olympics
European champions for France
Liga ASOBAL players
FC Barcelona Handbol players
THW Kiel players
Handball-Bundesliga players
Expatriate handball players
French expatriate sportspeople in Germany
French expatriate sportspeople in Spain
Medalists at the 2016 Summer Olympics
Olympic silver medalists for France
Handball players at the 2020 Summer Olympics
Medalists at the 2020 Summer Olympics
Naturalized citizens of France